"" is the de facto national anthem of Sweden. It was originally named "" ("Song to the North"), but the incipit has since been adopted as the title.

History 

Although the Swedish constitution makes no mention of a national anthem, "" enjoys universal recognition and is used, for example, at government ceremonies as well as sporting events. It first began to win recognition as a song in the 1890s, and the issue of its status was debated back and forth up until the 1930s. In 1938, the Swedish public service radio company Sveriges Radio started playing it in the evenings at the end of transmission, which marked the beginning of the de facto status as national anthem the song has had since.

Despite the belief that it was adopted as the national anthem in 1866, no such recognition has ever been officially accorded. A kind of official recognition came in 1893, when King Oscar II rose in honor when the song was played. In 2000, a Riksdag committee rejected a proposal to give the song official status as "unnecessary". The committee concluded that the song has been established as the national anthem by the people, not by the political system, and that it is preferable to keep it that way.

The original lyrics were written by Richard Dybeck in 1844, to the melody of a variant of the ballad "" (Death of the beloved). The ballad type is classified as D 280 in The Types of the Scandinavian Medieval Ballad; the variant from Västmanland that Dybeck reproduced is classified as SMB 133 G. It was recorded by Rosa Wretman at the beginning of the 1840s. Dybeck published the traditional text in Folk-lore I, and the melody in 1845 in his Runa, where he also published his new text "Sång till Norden" (Sing to/of the North).

Dybeck himself originally wrote the beginning as "" ("Thou old, Thou hale"), but in the late 1850s changed the lyrics to "" ("Thou old, Thou free"). The song was already published in several song books and sung with "", but a priest who had known Dybeck took the opportunity to inform the singer most associated with the song, opera singer , about the change in the year 1900. From that point on, printings of the "" version ceased to be seen in song books, but a recording from 1905 where it is sung with "friska" still exists. The Swedish composer Edvin Kallstenius made an orchestral arrangement of the song in 1933.

By the early 20th century, many regarded the song unsuitable as a national anthem. From the 1890s, it was included in the "patriotic songs" section of song books, but up to the 1920s it was occasionally published just as "folk music". In 1899, a contest to produce a national anthem was held. It led to Verner von Heidenstam writing "Sverige", but did not lead to a new national anthem.

Patriotic sentiment is notably absent from the text of the original two verses, due to them being written in the spirit of Scandinavism popular at the time ( in general refers to the Nordic countries in Swedish, Norwegian and Danish). After the song started to acquire its informal status as the national anthem, various people wrote additional verses to increase the "Swedishness" of the song. The aforementioned Lundqvist wrote his own third verse beginning with "" (I love thee, Sweden),  wrote four verses beginning with "" ("I love my native area") and  wrote two verses in 1910, which are presented as the last two verses in the lyrics section below. These verses however, are not accepted as part of the anthem, and are not generally published, and rarely if ever sung.

Melody

Lyrics

Sámi version

See also 

 Flag of Sweden
 National Day of Sweden
 Public holidays in Sweden
 Kungssången

Notes

References 

Sources

External links 
 
 

1844 songs
European anthems
National symbols of Sweden
National anthems
Swedish-language songs
National anthem compositions in B-flat major